This is a list of Bien de Interés Cultural landmarks in Ceuta, Spain.

 Royal Walls of Ceuta

References 

Bien de Interés Cultural landmarks in Ceuta
Ceuta